Mary Susan Applegate is an American songwriter, poet and lyricist who lives in Frankfurt am Main, Germany. 

She rose to prominence in 1984 with the lyrics to the multi-platinum hit “The Power Of Love”, and has since written songs for and co-written songs with multiple singers, and her songs have been constant part of the Eurovision Song Contest in recent years.

Career 
Applegate is best known for the song “The Power Of Love”. In 1985 the Jennifer Rush original took the number one position the UK, remaining there for 5 weeks.

In 1994 the song became Celine Dion’s first number one in the US Billboard charts, staying at the top for four weeks. Celine Dion’s version of "The Power Of Love“ won Mary S. Applegate the ASCAP Pop Award for “Most Performed Song” in the United States and was nominated for the Grammy Award for Best Female Pop Vocal Performance, American Music Award for Favorite Pop/Rock Single, two Billboard Music Awards for Hot 100 Single of the Year and Hot Adult Contemporary Single of the Year, and for the Juno Award for Single of the Year.

Shirley Bassey, Andrea Bocelli, Laura Branigan and Air Supply are among many world-renowned artists that covered the song.

Applegate went on to write various hit songs for:

Milli Vanilli, No Mercy, La Bouche,  Bad Boys Blue, Boney M., Banaroo, Bonnie Bianco, Jennifer Rush, Far Corporation, Aaron Carter, Liberty X and Le Click.

She worked with:

Nena, Udo Lindenberg, Dieter Falk, Tic Tac Toe, Funky Diamonds, Culture Beat, Yoomiii, Jazzamor, Cascada, Pur, Erkan Aki, Pete Seeger and Gotthard.

Earlier work includes "Do You Wanna" from the “1st album“ (1985) of Modern Talking co-written with Dieter Bohlen.

Applegate also left a footprint in the German Pop- and Schlager world, writing for acts like:

Thomas Anders, Nino De Angelo, Matthias Reim, Michelle and Helene Fischer.

Eurovision Song Contest 
Applegate won 2nd place together with Victor Drobysh in the 2012 Eurovision Song Contest with the Russian entry Buranovskiye Babushki song “Party For Everybody".

Other ESC entries were Natalia Podolskaya  "Nobody Hurt No One" in 2005 for Russia (position 15 in the finals) and helped pen the ESC Belarusian entry in 2016 "Help You Fly", by Ivan.

In 2019 Serhat sang “Say Na Na Na” for San Marino. It was only the second time San Marino made it into the ESC finals.

Poetry and Vocals 
Mary S. Applegate contributed poetry, lyrics and vocals to the German experimental electronic band Air Liquide, composed of Ingmar Koch (a.k.a. "Dr Walker") and Cem Oral (a.k.a. "Jammin' Unit"). The band was formed in 1991 in Frankfurt am Main, Germany.

Her vocals on Air Liquide's “This is not a Mind Trip” was used for the opening of the 1994 Love Parade in Berlin.

Screenplays 
Applegate collaborated with Frank Farian and Michael Stark on the storyboard for the Daddy Cool musical which opened in London's Westend at the Shaftesbury Theatre in 2006.

She currently is working on a biopic screenplay with Cine Golden Eagle Award winner, director and producer Sven Fleck.

Short Stories 
Further contributions can be heard on The Pete Wolf Band album 2084, where beside lyrics, she also co-penned 14 short stories with Pete Wolf.

Awards

Grammy Awards 
"The Power Of Love", (Celine Dion), Best Female Pop Vocal Performance (1994) - Nominated

American Music Award 
"The Power Of Love", (Celine Dion), Favorite Pop/Rock Song (1995) - Nominated

ASCAP 
"The Power Of Love", (Celine Dion), Most Performed Song. (1994)

Billboard Music Awards 
"The Power Of Love", (Celine Dion), Top Hot 100 Song Of The Year. (1994)

"The Power Of Love", (Celine Dion), Hot Adult Contemporary Single Of The Year. (1994)

Juno Award 
"The Power Of Love", (Celine Dion), Single Of The Year. (1995) - Nominated

References

External links 

https://www.imdb.com/name/nm2293710/ at the Internet Movie Database
https://www.allmusic.com/artist/mary-susan-applegate-mn0001800382/credits at allmusic.com
https://www.offiziellecharts.de/suche/person-73889 at offiziellecharts.de

American women poets
American women songwriters
Living people
1955 births
Air Liquide (band) members